Tiffin Girls' School is a girls' selective school in Kingston upon Thames, Southwest London, England; it moved from voluntary aided status to become an academy in 2011.

History

The Tiffin name is borrowed from Thomas and John Tiffin, prosperous brewers in the early seventeenth century, who left money in their wills for the education of the poor. The money was first used for scholarships for one or two boys to attend an existing private school but, thanks to investment and donations from other local benefactors, nearly 100 children were benefiting from the charitable fund by the 1820s.

By 1869, when the charity schools had closed and the money was no longer needed by the Public Elementary School, the Trustees proposed to dedicate the Tiffin money exclusively to Kingston Grammar School. The dispute that ensued went on until 1872 when it was ruled that the Grammar School should not receive more than a quarter of the income from charities. In 1874, plans were drawn up for two new schools, a Tiffins' School for boys and one for girls, each to take 150 pupils. The Tiffin Girls' School was originally called The Tiffin's Girls' School, but the name was changed as it caused some confusion.

The single building by "The Fairfield" (now recreational cricket ovals), which housed both schools, was completed in 1879 and opened in 1880. Rhoda Ward Fysh was appointed as the girls' school's first headmistress.  After fifty years in a previous building in Richmond Road, the school moved to its present site, also in Richmond Road, in 1987. The building had previously been occupied by The Tudor School which was closed by the local authority in 1986.

In 1999, the school benefited from a £500,000 Sport England Lottery Fund Grant. This, combined with fundraising from the school, enhanced the sports facilities for both school and community use. Improvements included a floodlit all-weather astro turf for hockey, floodlit netball/tennis courts and refurbished changing facilities as well as a community sports development programme for after school, weekends and holidays.

On 15 December 2003, a fire caused by a short circuit due to a leak in the roof burned down a large portion of the main building. The Tiffin Fire Appeal raised a significant amount of money for rebuilding.

The new part of the school was completed in 2006. The new wing was named the Holdsworth Wing after the retired Chair of Governors, Sandra Holdsworth. The construction of a new drama studio was completed in 2007. The school raised money for a new music studio, which opened in September 2009.

The school became an academy on 1 April 2011.

Present day
There are approximately 1,200 pupils aged between 11 and 18, including approximately 300 in the sixth form. They are split into six houses – Bebbington (Red),  Flavell (Yellow), Schofield (Blue),  Watson (Green), Orford (Orange) and Nicolle (Purple). All are named after former headmistresses of the school. Prior to 2012 pupils were split into house groups according to their forms (i.e. 10A, 11B etc.) until sixth form. From 2012 to 2016, forms were made up of girls of different houses. From 2016, the form system has reverted to girls of the same house. Pupils earn points towards the house competition in events such as the school birthday (last day before February half term) and sports day.

The house competition used to run throughout one academic year, but in 2008 was changed to run from Easter to Easter in order to allow the current House Officers to enjoy their victory. The house with the most points wins the Belitha trophy (donated by Edward Belitha).

Curriculum
Pupils in Years 7–9 study Maths, English, Biology, Chemistry, Physics, Religious Studies, Spanish, French, Latin, Design and Technology, Art, Computing, Music, Geography, History, PE and Drama. There is also one period of PSHE and Citizenship each week.

In Years 10 and 11, pupils continue 10 subjects to GCSE level. All GCSEs are sat at the end of Year 11. English Language, English Literature, Biology, Chemistry, Physics and Maths are compulsory. This leaves four options to be chosen, of which one must be a modern language (French or Spanish). Girls also take core PE lessons and have one period a week for PSHE and Citizenship.

In Year 12, pupils choose four subjects to begin their A level studies. Subjects follow A Level specifications with the exception of Music which follows the Pre-U course. At the end of Year 12, girls drop one subject, taking forward three subjects to A level.

Admissions
Entry into the school is by academic selection, using a Mathematics and English test and the school prioritises girls from its catchment area. Prior to 2012, the tests were both verbal and non-verbal reasoning, with a Mathematics and English test being added that year. From 2015 both rounds of tests were in Mathematics and English and the school added further priority to girls with pupil premium funding from its catchment area. 180 children are admitted to the school each year, this number being increased from 150.

Notable former pupils

 Elspeth Attwooll, Lib Dem MEP for Scotland
 Sophie Bray, British field hockey player who competed for Team GB at the 2016 Summer Olympics.
 Alison Cooper, businesswoman, chief executive of Imperial Tobacco
 Jan Etherington, writer and producer
 Lisa Faulkner, actress
 Barbara C. Freeman, author and illustrator
 Jill Gascoigne, actress
 Phyllis Ginger, artist
 Chloe Hayward, fashion model
 Amy Hoggart, comedian and actress
 Kim Ismay, actress
 Asha Leo, model/presenter
 Ingrid Oliver, comedian and actress
 Katherine Parkinson, actress
 Sophy Ridge, Sky News Senior Political Correspondent
 Rosianna Halse Rojas, Youtuber
 Lynne Truss, author
 Lorna Watson, comedian and actress
 Sarah Winckless, bronze medal winner at 2004 Olympics in women's double sculls

References

External links
 Official site

Girls' schools in London
Educational institutions established in 1880
Grammar schools in the Royal Borough of Kingston upon Thames
Academies in the Royal Borough of Kingston upon Thames
1880 establishments in England